The James Madison Dukes football program represents James Madison University in the sport of American football. The Dukes compete in the NCAA Division I Football Bowl Subdivision (FBS) as a member of the Sun Belt Conference (SBC), beginning play within the conference for the 2022 season. The university first fielded a football team in 1972, and the Dukes play at the on-campus Bridgeforth Stadium in Harrisonburg, Virginia. The Dukes are currently coached by Curt Cignetti.

The JMU football team has been the centerpiece of JMU sports since the early 1990s. Under former head coach Mickey Matthews the Dukes continued their rise in national prominence, winning the 2004 FCS National Championship. The Dukes won their second National Championship in 2016 and finished as national runners-up in 2017 and 2019.

Notable Dukes include Charles Haley, one of two players to win five Super Bowl rings and is also an inductee of the College Football Hall of Fame and Pro Football Hall of Fame; Scott Norwood, of the Buffalo Bills; Gary Clark, an All-Pro wide receiver for the Washington Commanders; and Arthur Moats, a linebacker for the Buffalo Bills and Pittsburgh Steelers who is known for delivering the sack that led to the end of the record streak of consecutive starts made by Brett Favre in the National Football League (NFL).

History

Early History (1972–1998) 

Just five years after (then) Madison College had become a coeducational institution, the Dukes fielded their first football team. Football was the brainchild of Dr. Ronald Carrier, Madison's president at the time, who was attempting to change the psychology of the campus away from an all-women's teachers college. The first game took place on October 7, 1972 against Shepherd College's junior varsity team at Harrisonburg High School. The team consisted of a few dozen walk-ons and was coached by 30-year-old Challace McMillin.

In 1975, the Dukes had their first undefeated season and won the Virginia College Athletic Association title. Two players, Madison Hall of Fame quarterback Les Branich and offensive guard Jeff Adams, played in both the Dukes' only winless season in 1972 and its only undefeated season in 1975.

For the 1980 season, Madison made the jump from NCAA Division III to NCAA Division I-AA where they played as an Independent through 1992. After twelve seasons the Dukes would join the Yankee Conference, which would become the Atlantic 10 Conference in 1997, then finally CAA Football, the technically separate football league operated by the all-sports Colonial Athletic Association, in 2007.

Mickey Matthews era (1999–2013) 

The Dukes made the NCAA playoffs in former head coach Mickey Matthews' first year with the team and in 2004, the Dukes won the Division I-AA (now FCS) National Championship behind quarterback Justin Rascati and running back Raymond Hines. They were the first and only team to win three games on the road to advance to the National Championship Game. They returned to the playoffs in 2006 but suffered an early exit to the hands of Youngstown State University. The Dukes went to the playoffs again in 2007, traveling to Appalachian State in the first round. While down 27–28, JMU lost the game with a fumble on the ASU 8-yard line in the closing seconds of the fourth quarter. In 2008, they posted a 10–1 season record (the lone loss coming in the season opener to FBS team Duke) and received the top seed in the playoffs behind sensational quarterback Rodney Landers. After defeating Wofford and Villanova (for the second time that season), they were defeated by the Montana Grizzlies in the semi-final round after Landers went down with an ankle injury. In the second week of the 2010 season, JMU beat then #13 FBS ranked Virginia Tech in Blacksburg 21-16

A $62 million stadium expansion to Bridgeforth was completed in 2011, adding an upper deck, club seating and 17 private suites. Bridgeforth's official seating capacity is approximately 24,877, and is designed so it may be expanded to seat over 40,000.

Matthews gained his 100th career victory on October 6, 2012 in a 13–10 win over the Towson Tigers.

At the end of the 2013 season, after going 6–6 and missing the FCS playoff for the fourth time in five years, Mickey Matthews was let go as the head football coach after 15 seasons at the helm for the JMU Dukes.

Everett Withers era (2014–2015) 
On December 21, 2013, Everett Withers, assistant head coach and co-defensive coordinator at Ohio State was named as the sixth head coach in the program's history by athletic director, Jeff Bourne. Prior to his work at Ohio State, Withers was interim head coach for North Carolina during the 2011 season after the dismissal of Butch Davis. His first win as interim head coach at North Carolina was against the Mickey Matthews led James Madison Dukes on September 3, 2011. While at JMU Withers compiled a 19-7 overall mark while making playoff appearances in both of his years in Harrisonburg. He also helped JMU receive national attention when ESPN's College GameDay show traveled to Harrisonburg to feature the 2015 Dukes.

Mike Houston era (2016–2018) 

On January 18, 2016, James Madison named Mike Houston as head coach of the Dukes football program. Houston was formerly head coach of the Lenoir-Rhyne Bears (2011–13) and Citadel Bulldogs (2014-15). Houston was very successful at Lenoir-Rhyne claiming three conference championships and an appearance in the NCAA Division II Football National Championship. At The Citadel, Houston led the Bulldogs to their first SoCon conference championship since 1992. In 2016 Houston defeated 4 FCS top 25 teams on the road as he led the Dukes to the 2016 Colonial Athletic Association football title with a 20–7 win over Villanova University gaining the University's first ever back to back titles. In the 2016 FCS playoff second round, he and the Dukes defeated the University of New Hampshire 55–22. The Dukes then went on to defeat Sam Houston State 65–7 in the NCAA FCS Quarterfinals. In the Semifinals, Mike Houston's Dukes defeated the five-time NCAA Division I FCS champions the North Dakota State University Bison 27–17, giving them the opportunity to face Youngstown State in the National Title Game on January 7, 2017 in Frisco, Texas.  JMU won the National Championship in decisive fashion, with a score of 28–14 (Youngstown State scored a meaningless touchdown with seconds left in the game) on a cold, 15 °F afternoon in Frisco, Texas

On January 7, 2017 JMU faced the Youngstown State Penguins football for the 2016 FCS National Championship at Toyota Stadium (Texas) in Frisco, Texas. JMU got off to a fast start leading Youngstown 21-0 by the middle of the second quarter. JMU QB Bryan Schor had two quick passing touchdowns and one rushing touchdown by JMU RB Khalid Abdullah got the game started quickly for the Dukes. Youngstown State battled back to score just before halftime to make it a 21-7 game at the half. JMU added another touchdown early in the third quarter extending their lead to 28-7. Youngstown State added a touchdown late in the 4th quarter but the game had already been decided. JMU finished off the game winning their second national championship by a final score of 28-14. JMU QB Bryan Schor threw for 112 yards and 2 touchdowns, JMU RB Khalid Abdullah rushed for over 100 yards and 2 touchdowns and JMU DB Jordan Brown finished with 7 tackles to lead the JMU defensive effort.

The Dukes started their title defense season on September 2, 2017 with a dominating win against Division 1 FBS members East Carolina, winning by a score of 34-14 to claim a victory over a team from college football's highest division for the second time in three seasons. The Dukes went on to finish with a perfect regular season record, including an 8-0 record in the Colonial Athletic Association- becoming the first team since 1977 to go undefeated in back-to-back CAA campaigns On Sunday November 19, JMU was awarded the #1 seed in the 2017 FCS Playoffs by the Selection Committee. After a First Round Bye, JMU faced the Stony Brook Seawolves in the FCS Second Round, winning by a score of 26-7. In the FCS Quarterfinals, the Dukes faced Big Sky member Weber State. Trailing late in the 4th quarter, JMU eventually won the game on a last second field goal, advancing to the FCS Semifinals to face South Dakota State, from the Missouri Valley Football Conference. In this game, the Dukes, bolstered by 10 takeaways on defense, cruised to an easy 51-16 victory, and earned a return trip to Frisco, TX to defend their 2016 National Championship. In the Title game, the Dukes were plagued by dropped passes and uncharacteristic turnovers, and fell to the North Dakota State Bison by a score of 17-13.

In 2017, JMU set program and CAA record winning streaks. Before falling to North Dakota State, the Dukes won their previous 26 games, dating back to the 2016 season, the 2nd longest winning streak in FCS history (NDSU- 33 games).

On Tuesday December 12, James Madison University announced Mike Houston had signed a 10 year contract extension to keep him at the school through the 2027 season.

The Dukes entered the 2018 season ranked second nationally behind only the defending national champion North Dakota State faced off against NC State to start the 2018 campaign and lost a close game by a score of 24-13. JMU then won its next four games as they held their #2 ranking. The Dukes then had their 19 game home win streak snapped against Elon who was ranked #10 in the country at the time. The Dukes also faced an uncharacteristic loss to New Hampshire later in the season as their record fell to 6-3. JMU won out the rest of the season but failed to win a share of the conference title for the first time since 2014. They earned an at large bid to the NCAA FCS Playoffs and faced Delaware in the First round, winning 20-6. The Dukes then traveled to Colgate in the second round of the playoffs amid rumors of Mike Houstons departure. JMU lost this game on a last second field goal. During the game, starting quarterback for JMU Ben DiNucci threw 5 interceptions and threw for 0 touchdowns as the Dukes lost 20-23. At the end of the season, JMU finished with a 9-4 record.

Following the conclusion of the 2018 season, Mike Houston accepted the position of head coach at East Carolina University.

Curt Cignetti era (2019–present) 

On December 14, 2018, it was announced that former Elon football head coach Curt Cignetti would be the 8th head coach of James Madisons football program.

The Dukes entered the 2019 season with 19 starters returning and a preseason ranking of #1 but not a consensus #1 as NDSU once again entered the season at #1 throughout most FCS polls.

#2 James Madison came three yards shy of forcing a potential overtime in the NCAA Division I Championship Game, but a late interception sealed a third consecutive national title for #1 North Dakota State in a 28-20 victory for the Bison on Saturday afternoon at Toyota Stadium. The Bison concluded the 2019 season with a perfect 16-0 record, while the Dukes saw their 14-game win streak end, completing the campaign at 14-2. JMU's 2019 senior class finished their careers with the most wins in school history, with 51 victories, and the Dukes are now 2-2 overall in national-title games. JMU also finished 2019 tied for the most wins in a single season, with 14. This matches the 2016 and 2017 seasons. Since 2016, all three meetings with JMU and NDSU have been decided by 10 points or less, a touchdown game in each of the national-title game matchups.

On November 6, 2021, it was announced that the James Madison football program had accepted an invitation to move up to the FBS Subdivision and would join the Sun Belt Conference prior to the 2023 football season. In response to this announcement, the all-sports CAA announced that James Madison would be banned from the conference's championships for the remainder of their time in the conference. This ban did not apply to football because CAA Football had no such provision in its bylaws.

Subsequently, James Madison announced they had finalized their departure from the CAA on February 2, 2022, and would join the FBS and the Sun Belt for the 2022-23 season.

JMU's arrival in FBS made the Dukes the second program, after UCF, to have played at all four current levels of NCAA football.

On October 9, 2022, the Dukes became the first ever first-year FBS program to be ranked in the AP Top 25, ranked 25.

Current Coaching Staff

Conference affiliations
1972–1973: Independent
1974–1975: Virginia Collegiate Athletic Association
1976: NCAA Division II Independent
1977–1979: NCAA Division III Independent
1980–1992: NCAA Division I-AA Independent
1993–1996: Yankee Conference
1997–2006: Atlantic 10 Conference
2007–2021: CAA Football
2022–present: Sun Belt Conference

Rivalries

Old Dominion

On October 26, the JMU Dukes and in-state rival Old Dominion Monarchs announced the official beginning of the "Royal Rivalry".  As the Virginia-based schools within the Sun Belt Conference, they will compete for an all-sports trophy that contains a football component and draws its name from the royal inspiration of both schools' mascots.

Old Dominion leads the all-time football series between the two schools 2-1, dating back to their days in the CAA.  JMU won the most recent meeting 37-3 on November 12, 2022.

Delaware

Richmond

William & Mary

Championships

National championships

Conference championships

Division championships

Postseason results

FCS Playoffs
The Dukes have appeared in the Division I-AA/FCS Playoffs 18 times, most recently in 2021. Their combined record is 24–16. They were Division I-AA/FCS National Champions in 2004 and 2016 and National Runners-Up in 2017 and 2019.

Head coaches

Future non-conference opponents
Announced schedules as of August 24, 2022.

References

External links

 

 
American football teams established in 1972
1972 establishments in Virginia